Padru (Gallurese: Patru) is a comune (municipality) in the Province of Sassari in the Italian region Sardinia, located about  north of Cagliari and about  south of Olbia.

The municipality of Padru contains the frazioni (subdivisions, mainly villages and hamlets) Sozza, Cuzzola, Sa Serra, Pedra Bianca, Biasì, Tirialzu, Ludurru, Sos Runcos, and Sas Enas.

Padru borders the following municipalities: Alà dei Sardi, Loiri Porto San Paolo, Olbia, San Teodoro (OT), Torpè, Lodè, Bitti.

References

External links

 www.comune.padru.ss.it

Cities and towns in Sardinia
1996 establishments in Italy
States and territories established in 1996